Events from the year 1314 in Ireland.

Incumbent
Lord: Edward II

Deaths
 Geoffrey de Geneville, 1st Baron Geneville (b. c 1229)

References